Under Her Control is a 2022 Spanish drama film directed by Fran Torres which stars Aitana Sánchez-Gijón and Cumelen Sanz

Plot 
Sofía, who works for a multinational company, gets pregnant. Desperate for offspring, Sofía's boss Beatriz offers her a bargain involving the child (to be given in adoption) in exchange for a job promotion. Instead of interrupting her pregnancy, Sofía accepts the offer.

Cast

Production 
La jefa is Fran Torres' debut feature film. The screenplay was penned by Laura Sarmiento. Produced by Feelgood Media, Francisco Torres Quincoces, Hugo-Daniel Boyero Garmendia, Penúltima Toma AIE, Teoponte PC and Audiovisuales del Monte, filming took place in 2021, shooting in Madrid in July.

Release 
Distributed by Filmax, it was theatrically released in Spain on 29 April 2022.

Reception 
Pablo Vázquez of Fotogramas rated the film with 4 out of 5 stars praising "its twisted and playful nature, worthy of the best exploitation cinema", assessing the give-and-take between a Joan Crawford-esque Sánchez-Gijón and the "young and enchanting" Cumelén Sanz to be the engine of the film.

Oti Rodríguez Marchante of ABC scored 2 out of 5 stars, writing that "the way in which the plot is complexified is overly forced, but it is easy to see the place towards which the plot is tumbling".

Carmen L. Lobo of La Razón gave it 3 out of 5 stars, praising "an always stupendous" Sánchez-Gijón as well as Cumelén Sanz, while also observing the similarities of the story with that of The Daughter.

See also 
 List of Spanish films of 2022

References 

2022 films
2022 drama films
Spanish drama films
Films shot in Madrid
2020s Spanish-language films
Spanish pregnancy films
2020s pregnancy films
Filmax films
2020s Spanish films
2022 directorial debut films